Calidus is Latin meaning fiery, spirited or rash. It can refer to:

Aircraft
AutoGyro Calidus, a German autogyro design
RotorSport UK Calidus, a British autogyro design

Animals
Barbus calidus, a ray-finned fish species in the family Cyprinidae, commonly called the Clanwilliam Redfin
Dardanus calidus, a species of hermit crab
Falco peregrinus calidus, a species of Peregrine Falcon
Rhodacaroides calidus, a mite in the family Ologamasidae